Dlawer Ala'Aldeen (born 1960) دلاوەر عبدالعزيز علاءالدين, is the Founding President of the Middle East Research Institute, a policy-research institute, based in Arbil, Kurdistan Region of Iraq.  He is a former Minister of Higher Education and Scientific Research in the Kurdistan Regional Government  (2009-2012) and former professor of Medicine at the University of Nottingham in the UK. His current focus is on policy research in the fields of good governance, rule of law, national security, governance reform and promotion of human rights.

Background and career
Dlawer Ala'Aldeen was born in the town of Koya, near Arbil, in Iraqi Kurdistan.  His father (Abdul-Aziz) was a primary school teacher and author of several books published in Kurdish, including "the life of Mohammad" and "Exegesis (Tafsir) of Quran".

Ala'Aldeen grew up in and around the city of Arbil, and studied medicine in Baghdad.  He immigrated to the [United Kingdom] in 1984 where he furthered his education and specialised in infectious diseases and clinical microbiology.  He studied tropical medicine at the London School of Hygiene & Tropical Medicine and trained for PhD in molecular microbiology at the MRC Clinical Research Centre, Harrow-London, UK. He was awarded MRC Research Fellowship before being appointed as a clinical academic in the Nottingham University Hospitals NHS Trust in 1992 and Professor of clinical microbiology in 2002.  He founded the Meningococcal Research Group in 1995, which then expanded into the Molecular Bacteriology and Immunology Group at the University of Nottingham in 1999. He was also the Founding Director of the MSc course in Clinical Microbiology in Nottingham University  He was seconded to the Health Protection Agency (later renamed Public Health England) as Deputy Director of the Centre for Infection in Colindale, London. Dlawer was appointed as the Director of Research at the Royal College of Pathologists in 2009.

On 28 October 2009, Ala'Aldeen was sworn in as the Minister of Higher Education and Scientific Research in Kurdistan Region of Iraq. He left the position as a result of KRG cabinet change on 5 April 2012. After a brief return to his University position in Nottingham, he founded a new policy-research institute (The Middle East Research Institute, MERI ) in Erbil, Kurdistan Region of Iraq.

Lobbying for human rights
Ala'Aldeen has long lobbied for Kurdish people's human rights and campaigned for a global ban of chemical and biological weapons. His own parents and siblings were among the survivors of the chemical weapons used in Iraq.

He was active in the late 1980s and early 1990s, lobbying within the British Parliament, media, and government. With UK-based colleagues, he founded the Kurdish British Scientific and Medical Support Group (KBSMSG) in 1988, which later became the Kurdish Scientific and Medical Association in 1989. He was elected as the founding Secretary and later the Chairman of KSMA, before the organisation expanded into the Kurdistan Medical and Scientific Federation.  He was also an active member of the British academic group, The Working Party on Chemical and Biological weapons between 1988-96.

Ala'Aldeen met Mrs/ Margaret Thatcher, the former British Prime Minister, and Dr George Carey, the Archbishop of Canterbury, in April 1991 and persuaded them to put pressure on John Major (then British Prime Minister)  and George HW Bush (then President of the USA) to help end Saddam Hussein's attack on the Kurds.  This was in the aftermath of the second Gulf War, when almost two million displaced Kurds fled to the borders with Iran and Turkey.  As a consequence, a "no-fly zone, Safe Haven" was established north of 36th parallel north that lasted from April 1991 until the fall of Saddam regime. The Safe Haven allowed the Kurds in Iraq to return to their homes, elect their own Kurdistan Regional Government and Kurdistan Parliament.  Ala'Aldeen has published a book on Lobbying for a Stateless Nation; and investigated the use of chemical weapons in Kurdistan, and the poisoning of Kurdish refugees in Turkey (published in the Lancet, 1990 Feb 3;335, p. 287-8).

Minister of Higher Education & Scientific Research
Ala'Aldeen has long been involved in capacity building for Iraqi and Kurdistan Universities and establishing academic links with British universities. On 28 October 2009, he joined Dr Barham Salih's Cabinet of Kurdistan Regional Government as Minister of Higher Education and Scientific Research.

He initiated a major reform process in the system of Higher Education, with the aim to raise standards and help Universities gain total independence.  He led a major and highly transparent scholarship program for sending thousands of students abroad for Masters and PhD studies.  His first-year report (A roadmap to quality) in 2010  and a second year report (On route to quality) in 2011 outline the process of reform, including the first introduction of teaching quality assurance in Universities, continuous academic development for teachers, split-site PhD programs, restructuring university management in preparation for independence, introducing electronic system for student applications, converting technical institutes to Polytechnic Universities and modernising postgraduate (specialised) clinical training.  He introduced the process of appointing staff on merit via open competition, and took measures to ensure equal opportunity and gender equality in the system of higher education.  He submitted two legislative drafts for reforms in higher education and postgraduate clinical training.  Ala'Aldeen faced fierce resistance from anti-reformists and interest groups, particularly when he closed down five private dental and pharmacy Colleges in 2010 and four previously licensed private Universities in 2011.

Middle East Research Institute
Ala'Aldeen is the Founding President of the Middle East Research Institute (MERI), an independent, grant-funded and non-profit think tank which is focused on policy-issues and governance reform in Iraq and Kurdistan Region. MERI became operational on 18 May 2014 and has been ranked the first in Iraq and 35th in the Middle East and North Africa (among 507 institutions, top 7%) according to the Global Go To Think Tank Index report  issued by the Think Tanks and Civil Societies Program at the University of Pennsylvania’s Lauder Institute.

Ala'Aldeen and colleagues have published numerous policy papers and reports on refugees, Internally Displace persons (IDPs), security dynamics in the Middle East, EU policies in the Region, post-ISIS Iraq, conflict resolution (e.g. the future of Kirkuk), promoting human rights (protecting minority's rights, prevention of violence against women prevention of violence against women) and institutional reform (Judiciary system, public prosecution, interior ministry and Ministry of Peshmarga).

Scientific work
From 1988 to 2014, Ala'Aldeen has worked on pathogenesis, molecular epidemiology and vaccine development of various bacterial pathogens, particularly Neisseria meningitidis (causes meningitis and sepsis) and Campylobacter jejuni (most common cause of food poisoning).  He and his research group discovered a number of bacterial virulence factors and identified their human target receptors. These virulence factors have been investigated for their vaccine potential. They have also studied the human genetic response to bacteria as well as the population genetics and genome evolution of N. meningitidis, Staphylococcus aureus and Pseudomonas aeruginosa.

Ala'Aldeen has published extensively in international scientific journals and co-authored three books in microbiology, Staphylococcus Aureus: molecular and clinical aspects; Molecular and Clinical Aspects of Bacterial Vaccine Development; and Medical Microbiology. He also holds numerous patents for anti-Campylobacter agents  and meningococcal vaccine candidates.

He was chairman or member of a number of National learned societies and committees, which included:
 Editorial board of three international microbiology/infection journals: Journal of Medical Microbiology, Journal of Infection, BMC Microbiology.
 Director of Research, Royal College of Pathologists (2009–10)
 Chairman, RCP/RCPath Infection Research Subcommittee (2007-9).
 Chairman, Clinical Microbiology Group of the Society for General Microbiology (2005–2009)
 Chairman, Federation of Infection Societies Scientific Committee (2007)
 Examination Board of the Royal College of Pathologists (2005–10)
 Medical Research Council's Infection and Immunity Board (2007–2010)
 Specialty Advisory Committee of the Royal College of Pathologists (RCPath) (2006–10)
 Health Protection Agency's Meningococcus Forum (1998-2010)

Kurdish writer
As a Kurdish writer, Ala'Aldeen has published numerous articles, mainly in the Hawlati newspaper, on the impact of global politics on Kurdistan and on strategic issues relating to Kurdish human rights.
He has published several books on politics and governance including: "Lobbying for a Stateless Nation" (2007);  "Nation Building and the system of self-governance in Kurdistan Region" (2013); and "State-Building: A roadmap for the rule of law and institutionalisation in Kurdistan Region" (2018). He comments regularly on local, regional, and international news channels offering his insight and analysis on current Kurdish, Iraqi, and Middle Eastern issues. Finally, Ala'Aldeen has a special interest in genealogy and has published a book on his family tree and history of his ancestors: The Heritage of Aziz and Nasreen, A History of The Ahmedi Malazada Family (London, 2021).

References

External links
 A list over some of his publications 

Living people
1960 births
Iraqi Kurdish people
Iraqi microbiologists
Iraqi emigrants to the United Kingdom
Academics of the University of Nottingham
British microbiologists
Kurdish-language writers
Alumni of the London School of Hygiene & Tropical Medicine
Fellows of the Royal College of Pathologists
Kurdish microbiologists